Chlorodiloma adelaidae is a species of sea snail, a marine gastropod mollusk in the family Trochidae, the top snails.

Description
This species differs only from Chlorodiloma crinita in lacking the tooth at the base of the columella. The coloration, sculpture and form are identical.

Distribution
This marine species is endemic to Australia and occurs off South Australia and Tasmania.

References

 Favanne, J. G. de 1784. Catalogue systématique et raisoné, ou description du magnifique cabinet appartenent ci-devant a M. le Comte de Latour d'Auvergne
 Philippi, R.A. 1851. Trochidae. pp. 137–232 in Küster, H.C. (ed). Systematisches Conchylien-Cabinet von Martini und Chemnitz. Nürnberg : Bauer & Raspe Vol. II.
 Adams, A. 1853. Contributions towards a monograph of the Trochidae, a family of gastropodous Mollusca. Proceedings of the Zoological Society of London 1851(19): 150-192
 Adams, H. & Adams, A. 1854. The genera of Recent Mollusca arranged according to their organization. London : John Van Voorst Vol. 1 pp. 257–484.
 Tenison-Woods, J.E. 1877. On some new Tasmanian marine shells. Papers and Proceedings of the Royal Society of Tasmania 1876: 131-159
 Tenison-Woods, J.E. 1877. Census; with brief descriptions of the marine shells of Tasmania and the adjacent islands. Papers and Proceedings of the Royal Society of Tasmania 1877: 3-34.
 Petterd, W. 1879. Critical remarks on the Rev. J.E. Tenison-Woods' "Census of Tasmanian Shells". Journal de Conchyliologie 2(12): 353-354
 Brazier, J. 1887. Trochidae and other genera of South Australia, with their synonyms. Transactions of the Royal Society of South Australia 9: 116-125
 Pritchard, G.B. & Gatliff, J.H. 1902. Catalogue of the marine shells of Victoria. Part V. Proceedings of the Royal Society of Victoria 14(2): 85-138
 Singleton, F.A. 1937. Lady Julia Percy Island. 1935 Expedition. Mollusca. Proceedings of the Royal Society of Victoria 49: 387-396

External links
 To Encyclopedia of Life
 To GenBank (2 nucleotides; 0 proteins)
 To World Register of Marine Species
 

adelaidae
Gastropods of Australia
Gastropods described in 1849